General elections were held in Belgium on 1 June 1958. The result was a victory for the Christian Social Party, which won 104 of the 212 seats in the Chamber of Representatives and 53 of the 106 seats in the Senate. Voter turnout was 93.6% in the Chamber election and 93.7% in the Senate election. Elections for the nine provincial councils were also held.

The election took place in a political crisis known as the Second School War. The outgoing anti-clerical "purple" government of the Socialist and Liberal Party, led by Achille Van Acker, reversed policies of the previous Catholic-led government regarding private schools. The Van Acker government lost the election, leading again to a Catholic government led by Gaston Eyskens. That government, which was a few seats short of a majority in the Chamber, would be the last single-party government in Belgian history. Later in 1958, the School War was ended by a cross-party agreement and the Liberal Party joined the government.

Results

Chamber of Deputies

Senate

References

General election
Belgian general election